Paul Annacone and Richey Reneberg were the defending champions, but competed this year with different partners.

Reneberg teamed up with Jared Palmer and successfully defended his title, by defeating Francisco Montana and Jim Pugh 4–6, 7–6, 6–4 in the final.

Annacone teamed up with Doug Flach and lost in the semifinals to Palmer and Reneberg.

Seeds

Draw

Draw

References

External links
 Official results archive (ATP)
 Official results archive (ITF)

Doubles
Verizon Tennis Challenge